Lisa Myers (born Joplin, Missouri) is an American journalist. She was the senior investigative correspondent for NBC Nightly News.

A 1973 graduate of the University of Missouri's Missouri School of Journalism in Columbia, Missouri, she joined NBC in 1981. From 1979 to 1981, Myers was White House correspondent for The Washington Star. From 1977 to 1979, she was a Washington correspondent for the Chicago Sun-Times. She retired from NBC News after 33 years in early 2014.

She lives in Washington, D.C.

Awards
2007 Gerald Loeb Award for Television Daily business journalism for "Trophy"
2006 George Polk Award
2005 Gracie Allen Individual Achievement Award as an Outstanding Correspondent
2004 Emmy Award for Business and Financial Reporting
2004 Clarion Award
2003 Joan Barone Award

References

External links

NBC News biography

Year of birth missing (living people)
Living people
American television reporters and correspondents
American women journalists
Chicago Sun-Times people
George Polk Award recipients
Gerald Loeb Award winners for Television
NBC News people
People from Joplin, Missouri
Missouri School of Journalism alumni
21st-century American women